Kendrick Lamar Live: The Big Steppers Tour (also known as The Big Steppers Tour: Live from Paris) is a 2022 American concert film directed by Mike Carson, Dave Free and Mark A. Ritchie. The film follows American rapper and songwriter Kendrick Lamar's second performance at Accor Arena in Paris, France on his fifth solo concert tour, the Big Steppers Tour.

The concert was narrated by English actor Helen Mirren and is based on Lamar's fifth studio album Mr. Morale & the Big Steppers (2022). It was broadcast live via Amazon Music's Twitch channel on October 22, 2022, to commemorate the ten-year anniversary of the release of his second studio album Good Kid, M.A.A.D City (2012). A director's cut was released exclusively to Amazon Prime Video on November 23.

Plot 
The film begins with the main section of the stage being covered under a white curtain. As the opening lines from "United in Grief" echo throughout the arena, eleven dancers emerge onto the catwalk. The men, dressed in black, and the women, dressed in white, make their way towards the main section to the instrumental of "Savior (Interlude)". Once the drape raises, the male dancers leave the stage; the female dancers slowly walk to the main section and pose on a bed. Lamar (who is addressed throughout the performance as Mr. Morale) is seen sitting at a piano with a small puppet resembling him resting on top. He performs the first verse of "United in Grief" before he and his puppet walk towards the middle stage. After a small pause, he continues the song by performing the chorus and second verse using ventriloquism.

After the song ends, Mr. Morale's therapist, voiced by actor Helen Mirren, introduces herself as his guide throughout the performance. She informs him that he's been living in his comfort zone, or box, for over 1,855 days (the period of time between the releases of his fourth and fifth studio albums) and that it was time for him to leave that space. He then performs "N95" with pyrotechnics and "ELEMENT." with his silhouette shown against the lowered curtain. Using the introduction from rapper Kodak Black, Mr. Morale performs the first and second verses of "Worldwide Steppers" with shadow play appearing on the curtain. He immediately performs "Backseat Freestyle" and "Rich Spirit" as the curtain rises once more. After skipping his way towards the main stage to the instrumental of "Rich (Interlude)", Mirren tells Mr. Morale that he's "once again let your ego get the best of you" before asking if she needed to remind him of "how this went before". He plays the melody of "HUMBLE." on the piano before performing the full song and descending the main stage.

Using the opening dialogue between himself and his longtime partner Whitney Alford, Mr. Morale is raised back onto the main stage sitting in a chair while performing the first and part of the second verses of "Father Time". Mirren shows sympathy for him, acknowledging that she can't blame him for "being a product of your environment," but advises him that it's "up to you to maneuver through it at this point." Mr. Morale then performs "m.A.A.d city" with some of the dancers, flashlights and additional pyrotechnics. The curtain lowers again before showing a silhouette of Mr. Morale arguing with a woman to the chorus of "We Cry Together". Now on the middle stage, he formally welcomes the audience to the show and performs the chorus and first verse of "Purple Hearts". As he's performing, the silhouetted couple works through their argument and embraces at the end.

After performing "King Kunta", Mr. Morale decides to "check the temperature" of the audience by performing a mashup of "LOYALTY." and "Swimming Pools (Drank)"; with the latter song featuring a partner dance behind him. He deems the audience ready to continue and performs the remix of "Bitch, Don't Kill My Vibe" with a female dancer performing a solo piece behind him. Three more female dancers join him as he performs "Die Hard". They all make their way towards the main stage as the four dancers perform a group piece to "LUST." while Mr. Morale lays in a bed. As he descends the stage, the curtain lowers once more and shows a silhouette that mirrored moving sunlight. Mirren condemns Mr. Morale, telling him that he "did this to himself again." She suggests that he's forgotten who he is and asks if he needed a reminder from her before continuing the performance. Mr. Morale responds by performing "DNA." and is advised by Mirren that in order "to move further, first you have to get past yourself."

Experiencing a breakthrough in his journey, Mr. Morale performs "Count Me Out". During the first verse, he's hunched over with his silhouette, whose back is pierced with arrows, appearing on the lowered curtain. He continues the song with all of his dancers before performing its outro by himself. After a small pause, he performs "Money Trees" and "LOVE." on the lower stage. Mr. Morale is then enclosed in a small box with four male dancers, each wearing hazmat suits. He is then instructed by Mirren to take a COVID-19 test, assuring him that it's "for your own good". After performing "Alright", Mirren then asks the audience if they were entertained before informing Mr. Morale that he has been contaminated. Smoke begins to seep into the box: Mirren assures him that it wasn't lethal. Still enclose in the box, Mr. Morale is elevated into the air while performing "Mirror". He breaks free from the box and performs the chorus and first verse of "Silent Hill". As he's lowered back down, Baby Keem appears on the main stage to perform a mashup of "Vent" and "Range Brothers" before performing a portion of "Family Ties". As Mr. Morale heads back to the main stage, Mirren tells him that the audience seems to follow him now and warns him that "with great power comes great responsibility." He performs "Crown" while playing the piano before being joined by Tanna Leone and all of the dancers to perform "Mr. Morale". "Savior" is the concluding song of the show, which was introduced with a video of Lamar using deepfake technology to morph himself into the three figures he mentions in the song's intro: rappers J. Cole and Future and basketball player LeBron James. Mr. Morale thanks the audience for attending and flashes a smile as he exits the stage and the curtain is lowered for the final time. Mirren congratulates him for making it out of the box before asking if he can stay out.

Cast 

 Kendrick Lamar
 Baby Keem
 Tanna Leone

Dancers
 Jaheem "FaceOff" Alleyne
 Camryn C. Bridges
 Jaida Brooks
 Rob "Disciple" Bynes
 Christian Davis
 James Dhaïti
 Joya Jackson
 D-Ran Neal
 Jackie Pipkins
 Alekz Samone
 Corey "CT" Turner

Performances 
List of performances adapted from NME.
 "United in Grief"
 "N95"
 "ELEMENT."
 "Worldwide Steppers"
 "Backseat Freestyle"
 "Rich Spirit"
 "HUMBLE."
 "Father Time"
 "m.A.A.d city"
 "Purple Hearts"
 "King Kunta"
 "LOYALTY." / "Swimming Pools (Drank)"
 "Bitch, Don't Kill My Vibe" (Remix)
 "Die Hard"
 "DNA."
 "Count Me Out"
 "Money Trees"
 "LOVE."
 "Alright"
 "Mirror"
 "Silent Hill"
 "Vent" / "Range Brothers" (with Baby Keem)
 "Family Ties" (with Baby Keem)
 "Crown"
 "Mr. Morale" (with Tanna Leone)
 "Savior"

Production 
On May 13, 2022, immediately following the release of his fifth studio album Mr. Morale & the Big Steppers, Kendrick Lamar formally announced his fifth concert tour, the Big Steppers Tour. Promoted by Live Nation Entertainment, the tour was sponsored by Cash App and Amazon Music Rotation, the streaming platform's flagship brand for hip hop and R&B. On October 18, while embarking on the tour's European leg, Lamar and Amazon Studios announced that his second performance at Accor Arena in Paris would be livestreamed through Amazon Music and exclusively released via Amazon Prime Video.

The concert film, directed by Mike Carson and Dave Free, required 18 months of "meticulous" planning and preparation. The film was executive produced by Lamar and Free for PGLang and Hank Neuberger for Springboard Productions. Amazon Music worked closely with PGLang to "figure out the right moment for this particular show." The two parties "went back and forth" on which performance across the tour would be ideal to record; ultimately choosing Lamar's second Paris performance as it marked both the ten-year anniversary of the release of his second studio album Good Kid, M.A.A.D City (2012) and co-opening act Baby Keem's birthday. Lamar's hometown performances in Los Angeles and shows across Scandinavia were analyzed to help shape plans for the film.

Along with the tour's usual personnel, the film needed additional camera operators and other technicians to handle its sound boards, lighting panels and a "galaxy of other NASA-level" technical equipment. Two trucks, one for video production and one for audio, were parked outside the arena for the recording; each truck contained "state-of-the-art" production studios. The film's "detailed" cinematography was choreographed before the recording and was captured across 19 cameras.

Release 
The concert film was broadcast live through Amazon Music and their Twitch channel on October 22, 2022; the livestream featured Keem and Tanna Leone's respective opening performances. It was also shown at pop-up viewing experiences in various locations, including a second location in Paris, Accra, Rio de Janeiro and the Brooklyn Museum. Merchandise for the recording, designed in partnership with clothing brand Union Los Angeles, was released on October 21. A director's cut of Lamar's performance was released exclusively to Prime Video on November 23.

Critical reception 
The concert film received critical acclaim for Lamar's performance, the stage production and the audience. Jem Aswad of Variety complimented the Parisian audience and how they went "absolutely batshit — they reacted to opener Tanna Leone like he was Baby Keem, and reacted to higher-billed opener Baby Keem like he was [Lamar], and reacted to [Lamar] like they’d just won $1,000." He then praised Lamar's "intricately planned and subtle" performance, writing that "unlike virtually every other rapper (with some top-shelf exceptions like Drake, Jay and Em), Lamar is a master of low-key intensity. He doesn’t jump, he rarely raises his voice, and he doesn’t dance conventionally. But a closer look reveals that the deeply disciplined control and complexity of his lyrics is fully equaled in his performance, from his moves to the lighting and effects."

In a five-star review, Fred Garratt-Stanley of NME praised the show's music direction, noting that "blending the moody introspection of [Mr. Morale & the Big Steppers] with the clean punchiness of [Good Kid, M.A.A.D City] is no easy task, but it is accomplished expertly." He also praised the performance's "inventive choreography and visual effects" that "take the show to new heights, without detracting from the musical focus, as sound and vision intertwine fluidly to create a genuinely staggering spectacle." Although he was disappointed that the Lamar didn't perform many songs from his third studio album To Pimp a Butterfly (2015), Garratt-Stanley lauded his "intricately choreographed and rehearsed" actions that made him believe at one point that he was watching a pre-recorded feed, his "intense dedication to his craft," and the rare glimpse of his "playful personality" near the end of the performance. "There’s a human touch here that can sometimes be lost in the midst of creative genius," he writes. ‘Mr. Morale’ insisted on showing the rapper’s flaws and deconstructing the god complex that surrounds him, although ironically, the album’s tour presents a creative vision that would boggle the minds of most mere mortals. It’s a stunning, moving display from a true great of modern rap."

References

External links 
 
 

2022 films
2020s American films
2020s English-language films
Amazon Studios films
Amazon Prime Video original films
Concert films
Films shot in Paris
Kendrick Lamar
Rap operas